Miss Teen USA 2022 was the 40th edition of the Miss Teen USA pageant. The competition was held on October 1, 2022 at the Grand Sierra Resort in Reno, Nevada. The competition was hosted by Miss USA 2021 Elle Smith and Christian Murphy. Breanna Myles of Florida crowned Faron Medhi of Nebraska as her successor at the end of the event.

Background

Location

On July 14, 2022, it was reported that the competition, including Miss USA 2022, would be held in Reno, Nevada, with the city securing a three-year deal to host the pageants in 2022, 2023, and 2024. This will be the second time that the pageant is held in Reno, following Miss Teen USA 2019. The following day, it was confirmed that the pageant would be held at the Grand Sierra Resort on October 1 by Crystle Stewart who confirmed that the location was chosen to honor Cheslie Kryst, whom had been crowned Miss USA 2019 in the same venue and had died by suicide in January 2022.

Selection of contestants
The COVID-19 pandemic impacted the duration between most of the state pageants from the previous year's competition, with previous year's state titleholders' reign being shortened to eight to eleven months, depending on state. Delegates from the 50 states and the District of Columbia are selected in state pageants which began in September 2021 and ended in July 2022, as the state pageant schedule can become very dense between the last state pageant held from 2021. The first state pageants were Idaho and Montana, held together on September 12, 2021, and the last state pageant was Colorado held on July 3, 2022.

Results 

§ – Voted into Top 16 through the online vote.

Special awards 

Order of Announcements

Top 16

Top 5

Pageant

Judges 
Allan Aponte – Puerto Rican makeup artist
Kaliegh Garris – Miss Teen USA 2019 from Connecticut
Bob Hartnagel – American public affairs consultant
Anita Krpata – American businesswoman and chief commercial officer (CCO) of SeneGence
Tanya Memme – Canadian television host and Miss World Canada 1993
Keylee Sanders Helmich – Miss Teen USA 1995 from Kansas

Contestants 
All 51 titleholders have been crowned.

Notes

References

External links 
 Miss Teen USA official website

Beauty pageants
2022
2022 beauty pageants
Beauty pageants in the United States